Teenage Fanclub Have Lost It is an EP by Scottish alternative rock band Teenage Fanclub, released in December 1995 on Creation Records. It reached #53 in the UK singles chart.

The EP consists of acoustic versions of four previously recorded songs, one from each of their previous four major studio albums. The EP's title is an allusion to the fact that these songs are acoustic versions, stripped of their usual instrumentation and amplification.

Background 
It was Teenage Fanclub's label, Creation Records, that suggested releasing an acoustic EP. "I think they had an idea of maybe us with a string section, a classy kind of thing," guitarist Raymond McGinley recalled in 2017. "And we thought, "Oh no, that sounds terrible." But we thought, "Maybe we could do something like that, but our way." The title was meant as a joke, "because we thought bands go away and they make an acoustic version of the records, and it's like bands have lost it when they do this kind of thing," McGinley said. He described the EP as "trying to take a kind of shit concept but do something that musically works."

Track listing

Personnel
Adapted from the EP's liner notes.

Teenage Fanclub
Norman Blake – vocals, melodica, acoustic guitar, Ibanez analog delay, treble recorder, harmonica, Roland MS-1 sampler, drums
Gerard Love – vocals, electric bass, acoustic guitar, five-string banjo, classical guitar, crotales, flageolet,  Vox organ
Raymond McGinley – vocals, acoustic guitar, slide guitar, Ibanez analog delay
Paul Quinn – drums, shaker, synthesizer, tambourine
Technical
Teenage Fanclub – producer
Duncan Cameron – producer, engineer
Nick Webb – mastering
Toby Egelnick – sleeve layout

References 

1995 EPs
Teenage Fanclub EPs
Creation Records EPs